José Gómez Gordóa (1913–2005) was a Mexican lawyer, university professor and diplomat.

20th-century Mexican lawyers
1913 births
2005 deaths
Recipients of the Order of Isabella the Catholic